Brasilogyps is an extinct genus of New World vulture from the Late Oligocene or Early Miocene of the Tremembé Formation, Taubaté Basin, São Paulo state, Brazil. The type species is B. faustoi. It is related to Coragyps and slightly larger than C. occidentalis.

References 

Cathartidae
Paleogene birds of South America
Oligocene animals of South America
Miocene birds of South America
Deseadan
Paleogene Brazil
Neogene Brazil
Fossils of Brazil
Fossil taxa described in 1985
Prehistoric bird genera